The Z Event is a francophone charity project created by Adrien Nougaret and Alexandre Dachary (respectively known under the pseudonyms ZeratoR and Dach) whose goal is to bring together French streamers to collect donations that will support a charity. It is hosted on the Twitch streaming platform.

The first edition took place in 2016 under the name Project Avengers. The event is in the benefit, successively, of Save the Children, the French Red Cross, Médecins Sans Frontières, the Pasteur Institute, Amnesty International, Action Against Hunger and four distinct associations acting in the environmental protection during the 2022 edition.

It has raised more money than any other french video gaming event. During the 2021 stream, Z Event raised €10 million Euros ($11.7 million), a world record. In total, between 2016 and 2022, these events raised more than 31.2 million euros or close to 34.6 million dollars.

Format 

The Z Event is an annual charity marathon organized since 2016 and taking place over three days. It brings together French-speaking streamers with the aim of collecting donations for a charity.

The event physically takes place in the Hérault department, more precisely at the Sud de France Arena in Montpellier, and is broadcast on the streaming site Twitch. All the creators present broadcast a video stream in succession, the content of which is mostly dedicated to video games, but also to discussions or physical events such as challenges, contests, quizzes or karaoke.

In order to encourage donations, the streamers present each define "donation goals", i.e. a list of donation objectives. For each goal they reach, they commit to a specific action, usually requested by their audience or fun to watch. In addition to the donations made, merchandise (mostly t-shirts) is sold to benefit the chosen charity.

Editions

Avengers Project (2016) 
The French branch of the "Avengers Project" took place from March 4 to 6, 2016, on the call of Bachir Boumaaza. Its charitable program "Gaming for Good" aims to collect donations for the NGO Save the Children during the drought in Ethiopia.

ZeratoR brought together 16 streamers and friends at his home for 34 hours of live, raising €170,770.

Z Event 2017 
The Z Event took place from September 8 to 10, 2017, to collect donations for the French Red Cross during Hurricane Irma in the West Indies.

This time, 30 streamers meet in a garage set up for the occasion. The event raised a total of €451,851.

He was congratulated by the President of the French Republic, then Emmanuel Macron, on Twitter.

Z Event 2018 
The Z Event took place from November 9 to 11, 2018, to collect donations for the Médecins Sans Frontières association.

In total, 38 streamers participate in this charity event organized in a room made available by the Occitania region. In 53 hours, the event brings in a total of €1,094,731.34. The sum raised was essentially used to reconstruct fully a destroyed hospital in Yemen.

During this edition, the event is broadcast live on NRJ radio

Z Event 2019 
Following the 2018 edition, organizers received over 400 requests from non-governmental organizations. After examining the latter, the Pasteur Institute was chosen. The 2019 edition of the Z Event took place from September 20 to 22, 2019, in Montpellier. In total, 55 Francophone streamers were gathered in a room made available by the Metropole of Montpellier for a total event duration of 54 hours. Squeezie, Antoine Daniel and Joueur du Grenier participated in the event.

On the second day, Riot Games made a donation of  €20,000, Webedia €25,000, then the American streamer Ninja  €26,000. A total of €3,510,682 were raised by the end of the event, breaking the record for the largest amount of money collected at a charity event on the live streaming platform Twitch. On his Twitter account, the President of the French Republic Emmanuel Macron congratulated the initiative.

Z Event 2020 

Due to the Covid-19 pandemic, the organization of a 2020 edition was initially uncertain. Indeed, ZeratoR said on April 29, 2020, live, at the time in full containment in France, that it may not be possible given the atmosphere of the time. On August 31, 2020, during a live performance where he returned to the Z LAN 2020, a few weeks before the event’s regular run (usually between September and November), he announced that "until the 2020 edition is announced, there will be none". Despite this, on October 4, 2020, the event was announced to be held from 16 to 18 October 2020 in Montpellier, the beneficiary of which will be Amnesty International France.

In order to limit the risk of Covid-19 propagation, ZeratoR announced at the same time a strict protocol. The 85 participants (including streamers and team members) had to pass a PCR test, and those who would be tested positive could not participate. The organisers therefore invited all participants to isolate themselves at home until October 16. The event took place for the first time in a hotel, that participants were not able to leave during the event.

The store sold over 120,000 T-shirts, and more than 132,000 donators of 1 euro registered during the event. On the Twitter account of the Presidency of the Republic, Emmanuel Macron congratulated the initiative as for the previous editions. Participants gathered in total more than 5.7 millions euros.

Z Event 2021 

A concert in support of the humanitarian organization, featuring performances by the musician  and the streamer LittleBigWhale, the group L.E.J, as well as the rapper Fianso, was played on October 28, in La Grande-Motte, in front of an audience of nearly 400 people. Its online broadcast was followed by more than 100 000 spectators.

ZeratoR's end stream was followed by  people simultaneously, and Inoxtag's stream peaked at  viewers when the young streamer invited the Mexican actress Andrea Pedrero, making it a record in France, and being the 3rd most watched stream ever.

Z Event 2022 

The 2022 edition was publicly announced on July 4th 2022 and will take place from 9 to 11 September 2022, initially dedicated to the GoodPlanet Foundation.

As in the previous edition, a concert is planned to be held the day before the launch of the event. It will include performances by PV Nova, the streamer LittleBigWhale, French Fuse, Berywam, Bigflo & Oli and Soprano at the Zenith of Montpellier.

Several criticisms emerged on social networks when the event was announced. They mainly target the absence of some streamers who participated to the previous editions, as well as the choice of the GoodPlanet Foundation as beneficiary association, this one facing many accusations of greenwashing especially around its financing.

Five days after the announcement, negative reactions online prompted the Z Event to cancel its partnership with the GoodPlanet Foundation. ZeratoR then announced that the money raised during the event would be divided equally among five associations, chosen by public vote from a shortlist of 22 organizations.

Participating streamers

References

Fundraising events
Projects established in 2016
Telethons
Charity events